Metachroma suturale is a species of leaf beetle. It is found in the United States, ranging from Arizona to Texas. Its length is between 4.8 and 6.4 mm.

References

Further reading

 
 
 
 
 
 

Eumolpinae
Beetles described in 1858
Taxa named by John Lawrence LeConte
Beetles of the United States